Old Catholic Church, various churches which have their origins in separations from the Roman Catholic Church or which formed later with a similar identity

Old Catholic Church may also refer to:
History of the Catholic Church
Lakeport Church (Yankton County, South Dakota), listed as "Old Catholic Church" in the National Register of Historic Places

See also
List of Old Catholic churches